Nikola Grubješić (Serbian Cyrillic: Никола Грубјешић; born 29 June 1984) is a Serbian retired professional footballer and current coach.

Club career
Grubješić came through the youth system at Partizan. He played for their affiliated club Teleoptik, before being promoted to Partizan's first team during the 2003–04 season.

International career
Grubješić was a member of the Serbia and Montenegro national under-21 team for which he scored three goals in three appearances against Macedonia U21.

Personal life
His father, Pavle Grubješić, also a footballer, played for Partizan in the 1970s.

References

External links
 
 

1984 births
Living people
Sportspeople from Šabac
Serbian footballers
Serbian expatriate footballers
Serbia and Montenegro under-21 international footballers
Association football forwards
FK Teleoptik players
FK Partizan players
FK Partizan non-playing staff
FK Voždovac players
FK Čukarički players
Serbian SuperLiga players
FC KAMAZ Naberezhnye Chelny players
Expatriate footballers in Russia
Hapoel Haifa F.C. players
Israeli Premier League players
Expatriate footballers in Israel
Athlitiki Enosi Larissa F.C. players
Expatriate footballers in Greece
FK Leotar players
Expatriate footballers in Bosnia and Herzegovina
Syrianska FC players
IF Brommapojkarna players
Superettan players
Expatriate footballers in Sweden
Dunaújváros PASE players
Expatriate footballers in Hungary
Davao Aguilas F.C. players